Captain Ingram's Partisan Rangers was the name given by the Sacramento Union to a band of about fifty Confederate Bushwackers organized from local Copperheads and members of the Knights of the Golden Circle in 1864 by Rufus Henry Ingram in Santa Clara County, California.  They committed the Bullion Bend Robbery and planned other raids before being broken up by the Union authorities.

Newspapers of the time reported that Ingram had been a member of Quantrill's guerrilla band, but modern research has failed to confirm that.  He came to California via Mexico with the intent of forming a Confederate guerrilla band on the Pacific Coast.  After the gang was broken up in several bloody gunfights, Ingram fled California and vanished forever.

Members
  Rufus Henry Ingram, Captain
  Thomas Bell Poole, Lieutenant
  George Baker
  John Creal Bouldware
  John Clenndenning
  Wallace Clenndenning
  George Cross
  James Frear
  Thomas Frear
  Joseph W. Gamble
  John Gately
  Alban H. Glasby
  Jim Grant
  Preston C. Hodges
  John Ingram
  Henry I. Jarboe
  Washington Jordan
  John A. Robinson
  James Wilson.

See also
California Civil War Confederate Units

References

Bushwhackers
Units and formations of the Union Army from California
History of Santa Clara County, California
Irregular forces of the American Civil War